The 2014 San Jose Earthquakes season is the club's 17th year of existence, as well as its 17th season in Major League Soccer and its 7th consecutive season in the top-flight of American soccer. Including all previous franchises, this is the 32nd year with a soccer club in the San Jose area sporting the name "Earthquakes".

This was the final season of the Earthquakes playing in Buck Shaw Stadium as the club would move into its new stadium for the 2015 season.

Background

Review

Club

Current roster 

As of May 25, 2014.

Out on loan

Club staff 

 

|}

Other information

Competitions

Preseason

Central California Cup (preseason)

Rose City Invitational (preseason)

Preseason

2014 season

Results by round

Match results

U.S. Open Cup

CONCACAF Champions League

Championship Stage

International Friendlies

Standings

Western Conference

Major League Soccer

Statistics

Transfers

In

MLS Drafts

Winter Transfer Window

Out

References 

San Jose Earthquakes seasons
San Jose Earthquakes
San Jose Earthquakes
San Jose Earthquakes